The Cagliari trolleybus system forms part of the public transport network of the city and comune of Cagliari, in the region of Sardinia, Italy.

In operation since 1952, the system presently comprises three routes, serving the city and the surrounding comuni.

Services
The three routes comprising the present Cagliari trolleybus system are:

  Parco San Michele – San Bartolomeo
 Lungomare Poetto-Cinquini (active during the summer only
  Cagliari (Piazza Matteotti) – Selargius – Quartu Sant'Elena – Cagliari (Piazza Matteotti)
  Cagliari (Piazza Matteotti) – Quartu Sant'Elena – Selargius – Cagliari (Piazza Matteotti)

Trolleybus fleet

Retired trolleybuses
 Fiat 668 Cansa (9 trolleybuses, nos. 501 to 509), served from 1952 to summer 1972.
 Fiat 2405 Casaro (11 trolleybuses, nos 551 to 561), served from 1955 to 1986. The only remaining example, no. 552, is kept at the National Museum of TransportIT in La Spezia.
 Fiat 2405 Lancia Esatau P (6 trolleybuses, nos. 562 to 567), served from 1957 to 1971.
 Fiat 2405 Casaro (25 trolleybuses, nos. 568 to 592), served from 1962 to 1989.
  (15 trolleybuses, nos. 601 to 615), served from 1981 to 2003, dismantled in 2008.
 Socimi 8839 (20 trolleybuses, nos. 616 to 635), entered service in 1986-87 season, dismantled in 2012.

Current fleet
 Socimi 8845 (16 trolleybuses, nos. 636 to 651), entered service in 1991-92 season; six were still active as of mid-2014.
 Solaris Trollino 12 (16 trolleybuses, nos. 701 to 716), entered service between March and June 2012.

On order
 Van Hool A330T (14 trolleybuses); order placed in May 2014, with delivery due around mid-2015.

See also

Cagliari railway station
List of trolleybus systems in Italy

References

Notes

Books

External links

This article is based upon a translation of the Italian language version as at March 2011.

Cagliari
Cagliari
Transport in Cagliari